Highway 641 is a 600-series municipal highway in the Canadian province of Saskatchewan. It runs from Highway 39 near Rouleau north to Highway 15 at Semans. The highway intersects the Trans-Canada Highway south of Pense and east of Belle Plaine, Highway 20 at Lumsden, and Highway 22 at Earl Grey. Local Improvement Districts were the precursors of rural municipalities which initially established and maintained roads in their area. Early settlers helped to construct and maintain the route and would get paid road improvement wages from the local rural municipality. The  concurrency between Highway 20 and Highway 641 was constructed in 1927 following the removal of the Canadian National Railway line between Lumsden and Craven. The remainder of the road followed Dominion land survey township and range lines.

Route description 
Highway 641 begins near Rouleau and extends north  to the Trans-Canada Highway intersection. This area is part of the Regina Plain landscape area of the Moist Mixed Grassland ecoregion featuring mainly cereal crops in the dark brown soils. At km 24.6, Highway 641 enters the village Pense. At km 25.4, it intersects Highway 730. Highway 730 connects to Regina east of this intersection. Lumsden is located at the km 55.9 intersection with Highway 11 in the Qu'Appelle Valley. The town of Lumsden features the Lumsden Museum which is home to several restored heritage buildings. The Lumsden Trans Canada Trail Committee helped establish  of the Trans Canada Trail. The trail has been groomed for walking, hiking, cycling, skiing, horseback riding, canoeing, and snowmobiling. Craven, the home of the Craven Country Jamboree, is located at the Highway 99 and Highway 20 junctions. This final stretch of the highway is part of the Strasbourg Plain landscape area of the Moist Mixed Grassland ecoregion featuring small trembling aspen bluffs around the occasional slough. Earl Grey is located at the intersection with Highway 22. There are no localities located at the intersection with the secondary Highway 731. Last Mountain House Provincial Park protects the heritage site of the Hudson's Bay Company post Last Mountain House established in 1869. The terminus of Highway 641 is at the Highway 15 intersection at Semans.

History 
Between 1897 and 1909, municipal administration affairs were handled by  Local Improvement District (LID) Number 165. The LID changed its boundaries on December 13, 1909, and on January 1, 1913, the LID was renamed Pense No. 160. During the 1940s work was undertaken on paving roadways, a man could earn 35 cents an hour or $ today a man and two horses could be employed at a rate of 65 cents an hour $ today, a horse drawn drag would earn 37.5 cents an hour $ today, and if a farmer owned a tractor, a tractor drawn drag could earn as much as 50 cents per hour $ today.

The Saskatchewan Highway Act was established in 1922, in compliance with the 1919 Canadian Highway Act. At the initial stages of the Saskatchewan Highway Act,  of provincial highways were gravel and the rest were earth roads. The road allowances were laid out as a part of the Dominion Land Survey system for homesteading.  Travel along the Provincial Highway 641 before the 1940s would have been travelling on the "square" following the township road allowances, barbed wire fencing and the Canadian Northern rail line. As the surveyed township roads were the easiest to travel, the  first highway was designed on 90-degree, right-angle corners as the distance traversed the prairie along range roads and township roads.

There is a historical monument erected along the highway which states that the early railway was established along the east side of the Last Mountain Lake (Long Lake) in 1907, and constructed on the west side in 1911. The monument documents as well the Lady of the Lake sternwheeler which was used on Long Lake. Local historians clarify that the rail came to the east of the Lake in 1911, and to the west in 1912.  The Lady of the Lake began as a sternwheeler, but was modified to a screw propeller. Also on the Lake the S.S. Qu'Appelle, a luxurious steamer, towed a barge across the lake.

Lumsden was initially served by the Canadian National Railway (CNR), however the Canadian Pacific Railway (CPR) was built through Craven in 1910. The new line brought freight to Lumsden infrequently and the elevator was torn down in 1927, and the CNR track removed the next year. The highway went through where the CNR bridge had been built. Highway 20 is marked on an early 1926 and 1955 maps, but highway 641 is unmarked – showing up as surveyed township and range roads only.

Intersections

See also 
 Roads in Saskatchewan
 Transportation in Saskatchewan

References 

641